Formosargus is a genus of flies in the family Stratiomyidae.

Species
Formosargus berezovskiyi Fachin & Hauser, 2022
Formosargus borneensis Fachin & Hauser, 2022
Formosargus kerteszi James, 1939
Formosargus lineata (Meijere, 1913)
Formosargus mangoleensis Fachin & Hauser, 2022
Formosargus sagittocera (Adisoemarto, 1974)
Formosargus trivittatus Fachin & Hauser, 2022
Formosargus variegatus James, 1969
Formosargus woodleyi Fachin & Hauser, 2022

References

Stratiomyidae
Brachycera genera
Diptera of Asia
Diptera of Australasia